Brett Chivers (born 14 December 1976) is a Guamanian sailor. He competed at the 1996 Summer Olympics and the 2000 Summer Olympics.

References

External links
 

1976 births
Living people
Guamanian male sailors (sport)
Olympic sailors of Guam
Sailors at the 1996 Summer Olympics – Laser
Sailors at the 2000 Summer Olympics – Laser
Place of birth missing (living people)